Mycosphaerella pyri is a fungal plant pathogen.

See also
 List of Mycosphaerella species

Fungal plant pathogens and diseases
pyri
Fungi described in 1869